Johannes Voigtmann (born 30 September 1992) is a German professional basketball player for Olimpia Milano of the Italian Lega Basket Serie A (LBA) and the EuroLeague. He is also a member of the senior German national team. He is 2.11 m tall and he plays at both the power forward and center positions.

Professional career

Germany

Voigtmann played handball in his hometown of Eisenach before turning to basketball. After making noise in the Jena youth ranks, he made his debut in Germany's second-tier ProA with Science City Jena during the 2010-11 campaign. In 2012, he signed a 2-year deal with Basketball Bundesliga side Fraport Skyliners. He extended his contract with the Skyliners for 2 more years in 2014. In 2015, he made his first All-Star Game appearance. In the 2015–16 season, Voigtmann won the FIBA Europe Cup championship with the Skyliners, after beating Openjobmetis Varese in the cup's final.

Baskonia
In June 2016, Voigtmann signed with Baskonia of the Spanish top-flight Liga ACB. In his EuroLeague debut with Baskonia, Voigtmann scored 12 points in an 85–84 win against Anadolu Efes. In his first EuroLeague season, he averaged 10.1 points, 7 rebounds and 1.7 assists over 33 games. In his first season with Baskonia in the Liga ACB, he averaged 7.8 points, 1.8 assists and 6 rebounds in 32 games. In the 2017–18 ACB season he played 33 games of Liga ACB, and averaged 7.8 points, 1.7 assists and 5.2 rebounds. In the 2018–19 ACB season, his last before moving to CSKA, he played 33 games, averaging 9.3 points (career high in Spain), 2.5 assists, and 5.6 rebounds.

CSKA Moscow
On July 2, 2019, CSKA Moscow announced that Voigtmann had signed a 2-year deal with the team with an option for a third year. On June 11, 2021, said option was exercised by the Russian club, keeping Voigtmann in Moscow for another season.

Voigtmann played 28 games with CSKA in the 2019–20 EuroLeague, averaging 7.7 points, 1.5 assists and 5.2 rebounds. In his second season at CSKA he played 37 games in the 2020–21 EuroLeague, and averaged 8.5 points, 1.3 assists, and 5 rebounds therein. He played 16 games in the 2019–20 VTB United League, averaging 8.6 points, 1.8 assists and 4 rebounds. In the 2020–21 VTB United League he played 28 games, and averaged 10 points, 2.3 assists and 6 rebounds.

On February 27, 2022, upon the outbreak of the 2022 Russian invasion of Ukraine, he left the team. He said: "In the current situation, I can't reconcile myself playing for a Russian team. Even if it's just about basketball, it involves symbolism that I think is inappropriate at the moment. The Russian president is responsible for a brutal war, because of which innocent people are dying in Ukraine. Millions of people have to flee their homes, and children, in particular, are losing their homes or even their lives. I just couldn't stay in Russia and carry on as if nothing had happened...."
The team accused him of violating his contract.

Olimpia Milano
On September 2, 2022, Voigtmann signed a two-year contract with Olimpia Milano of the Italian Lega Basket Serie A (LBA) and the EuroLeague.

International career
In 2014, he made his debut in the senior German national team, when he played in the qualifying rounds for EuroBasket 2015. He played his first game with Germany in a friendly match, which his team lost to Italy, by a score of 91–59.

He represented Germany at the EuroBasket 2015.

2020 Summer Olympics
Voigtmann helped Germany to qualify for the 2020 Summer Olympics. He scored a jumper in a team-high 13 points for his national team against Russia, leading Germany to a 69–67 win.

At Tokyo 2020, Germany men's national basketball team managed to reach the quarterfinals, something that had happened only in 1984 and 1992. He was the rebounding leader against Italy, in their first game in the tournament, lost 82–92 by Germany. Voigtmann was Germany's leading scorer and top performer against Nigeria, recording 19 points, grabbing 7 rebounds, and dishing out one assist for a 21 efficiency in Germany's 92–99 win. He grabbed 13 rebounds in Germany's loss to eventual bronze medalist Australia, in their third and last game of the group stage.

Voigtmann played positively at the 2020 Summer Olympics basketball tournament. He averaged 8 rebounds, being the fifth rebounding leader of the tournament. He also shot 35.7 from three. By the end of the tournament, he was ranked among the players who "should be on NBA radars".

Career statistics

EuroLeague

|-
| style="text-align:left;"| 2016–17
| style="text-align:left;" rowspan=3|Baskonia
| 33 || 24 || 23.3 || .518 || .315 || .731 || 7.0 || 1.7 || .6 || .3 || 10.1 || 15.0
|-
| style="text-align:left;"| 2017–18
| 34 || 12 || 21.2 || .621 || .577 || .667 || 4.4 || 1.6 || .4 || .3 || 8.7 || 11.6
|-
| style="text-align:left;"| 2018–19
| 33 || 21 || 24.1 || .596 || .309 || .756 || 5.8 || 2.6 || .6 || .2 || 7.5 || 11.4
|-
| style="text-align:left;"| 2019–20
| style="text-align:left;" rowspan=3| CSKA Moscow
| 28 || 24 || 22.2 || .563 || .410 || .571|| 5.2 || 1.5 || .6 || .1 || 7.7 || 9.4
|-
| style="text-align:left;"| 2020–21
| 37 || 3 || 19.3 || .611 || .464 || .863|| 4.9 || 1.3 || .5 || .3 || 8.5 || 11.4
|-
| style="text-align:left;"| 2021–22
| 20 || 13 || 21.1 || .696 || .395 || .800 || 4.0 || 2.0 || .6 || .4 || 8.4 || 10.2
|- class="sortbottom"
| colspan=2 align=center | Career
| 67 || 36 || 22.3 || .576 || .424 || .705 || 5.7 || 1.7 || .5 || .3 || 9.4 || 13.1

International

Honours
FIBA Europe Cup: 2015–16

Individual awards
BBL All-Star: 2015, 2016
All-BBL Second Team: 2015–16
BBL Most Improved Player: 2014–15
BBL Best German Young Player: 2014–15

References

External links
Johannes Voigtmann at acb.com 
Johannes Voigtmann at euroleague.net
Johannes Voigtmann at eurobasket.com
Johannes Voigtmann at fiba.com
Johannes Voigtmann at fibaeurope.com

1992 births
Living people
Basketball players at the 2020 Summer Olympics
Centers (basketball)
German expatriate basketball people in Italy
German expatriate basketball people in Russia
German expatriate basketball people in Spain
German men's basketball players
Liga ACB players
Olimpia Milano players
Olympic basketball players of Germany
PBC CSKA Moscow players
People from Eisenach
Power forwards (basketball)
Saski Baskonia players
Science City Jena players
Skyliners Frankfurt players
Sportspeople from Thuringia
2019 FIBA Basketball World Cup players